Khidki: Humari Funny Kahani is an Indian Hindi language mini-series produced by Hats Off Production. The show premiered on 28 June 2016 and is based on users who tweet their funny stories in 140 characters on Twitter. Casting director is Vineeth Pandey.

Stories

Cast
Jamnadas Majethia as Host
Aishwarya Sakhuja as Anju (Story no. 1 – Anju Ki Shaadi)
Rajeev Mehta as Ashok Thakkar( Ep1)
Lubna Salim as Jyoti Thakkar in Ep1
Sarita Joshi as Lalita Swami in Ep2 and in Ep9 saal ki daadi maa as Dadi Maa.
Abraam Pandey as Amir
Astha Agarwal
Shraddha Musale as Bhanupriya (Story no. 2 – Govinda Govinda), as Chudail (Story no. 17 – Bhoot Bangla)
 Deepali Pansare as Shanti (In Story no. 2 – Govinda Govinda)
Simran Kaur Hundal as Ghost (In Story no. 13 - Bhootani Bani Mehmaan)
Shivshakti Sachdev as Disha (In Story no.14 - Har Ek Friend Namuna Hotha Hai)
Kishori Godbole in Guru Daxina
Arvind Vaidya as Jamnadas's Father in Ep-Bhoot Bangla and in one more episode. (In two episodic stories)
Jamnadas Majethia
Manav Gohil
Krishna Bharadwaj
Sarita Sharma
Jay Saumik Joshi
Shriya Popat
Prasad Barve
Punit Talreja
Ajay Chaudhary
Sheena Bajaj as Simran (Story no. 15 – Hum Sath Sath Hain)
Chandni Bhagwanani as Kiran (Story no. 15 – Hum Sath Sath Hain)
Vishal Bhardwaj as Vikram (Story no. 15 – Hum Sath Sath Hain)
Falguni Rajani
Rahul Rudra Singh as Sudhir (Story - 1947 ki baat hai )
Sushmita Mukherjee 
Ketki Dave 
 Devender Chaudhury 
Suchita Trivedi 
Supriya Pathak
Mehul Buch

List of episodes

References

Sony SAB original programming
Indian anthology television series
2016 Indian television series debuts
2016 Indian television series endings
Television shows set in the British Raj
Television series about twins
Hats Off Productions